Graeme or Graham Davi(e)s may refer to:

 Graeme Davis (game designer) (born 1958), role-playing games author, and novelist
 Graeme Davis (mediaevalist) (born 1965), academic medievalist
Graeme Davies (1937–2022), New Zealand engineer and academic
Graham Davis (born 1953), Australian journalist
Graham Davis (racing driver)